The European motorcycle Grand Prix was a motorcycling event that was introduced as part of the Grand Prix motorcycle racing World Championship from 1991 to 1995. From 1996 onward the event was replaced by the Catalan Grand Prix. In 2020, the event was briefly revived, with the race taking place on the Circuit Ricardo Tormo. The decision was largely influenced by the COVID-19 pandemic, which led to the change of the calendar.

Between 1924 and 1948, the European Grand Prix was not a race in its own right but just an honorific title; one of the national Grands Prix was also designated as the European Grand Prix. The first race to be so named was the 1924 Nations Grand Prix, held at the Monza circuit in Italy. Until 1937, the winners of the race designated the European Grand Prix were awarded the title of European champion. In 1938, the European championship became decided over a series of races and the European Grand Prix designation was not used again until 1947, although no longer awarding the European championship title.

Official names and sponsors 
1991: G.P. de Europa (no official sponsor)
1992: Gran Premio Super Nintendo Entertainment System de Europa
1993–1994: Gran Premi Pepsi d'Europa
1995: Gran Premio Marlboro de Catalunya
2020: Gran Premio de Europa (no official sponsor)

Track gallery

Winners of the European motorcycle Grand Prix

As a standalone event

Multiple winners (riders)

Multiple winners (manufacturers)

Multiple winners (countries)

By year

As an honorary designation

By year

References

 
Recurring sporting events established in 1924
1924 establishments in Italy
Motorcycle racing in Spain
Recurring sporting events disestablished in 2020
2020 disestablishments in Spain